Thane–Belapur Road is a major road connecting the city of Thane with Navi Mumbai. The southern end of Thane–Belapur Road starts at the Sion Panvel Highway near Juinagar. The road passes through a busy Thane – Belapur region and generally runs in a north-south direction. During the stretch between Turbhe and Digha, the Thane–Belapur Road runs completely parallel to the Trans-Harbour Line of Mumbai Suburban Railway and the stations of Airoli, Rabale, Ghansoli, Kopar Khairane and Turbhe all have direct access from this road. This road also connects the cities of Thane, Kalwa, and Airoli to the Mumbai-Pune Expressway.

Except for a small stretch at Digha, the entire Thane–Belapur Road has been widened to a total of 6 lanes (3 lanes in each direction) and fully concretized. Several major industrial parks such as MIDC, Airoli IT Park, Reliance Jio Infocomm Limited, Dhirubhai Ambani Knowledge City, Millennium Business Park, Reliance Hospital, and DY Patil Stadium are located beside this road in addition to many other businesses and corporate premises.

Major intersections
Sion Panvel Highway at Turbhe
Vashi-Turbhe link road at Turbhe
Palm Beach Marg at Pawane
Vashi-Shil Phata road at Mahape
Airoli Bridge road at Airoli
National Highway 4 at Kalwa

Gallery

References 

Transport in Navi Mumbai
Roads in Maharashtra
Transport in Thane